The Church of God in Hong Kong (Chinese: 香港神的教會), commenced in 1968, is a biblical Christian church in Hong Kong. Its main office is located at Shop 7, Upper G/F, Lai Chi Kok Bay Garden, 272 Lai King Hill Road, Kwai Chung, N.T. There are 16 meeting places located in Hong Kong Island, Kowloon and the New Territories. The church has a congregation of about 5,000 members.

Overview 

The Church of God in Hong Kong was founded by Yu Kwong Chiu Daniel in 1968, and started its ministry in Shatin. In the 1970s, the believers started to attend meetings at Pui Shing Primary School in Lam Tin. Yu Kwong Chiu Daniel, together with other devoted Christians, preached the gospel to the children in public estates. In the late 1970s, their ministry rapidly expanded to Tsuen Wan that attracted a large group of factory workers and secondary school students. Today, the Church of God in Hong Kong has spread its ministry in various categories of people including children, primary schools students, secondary schools students, university students, on-job population, families, seniors and the elderly.

In 1982, the Church of God in Hong Kong began their overseas ministry, that they first established the Church of God in Macau. Over 30 years of missionary, the church has established meeting places in 59 cities. The Church of God in Hong Kong is different from other denominational churches in terms of their practice of “global unity”, that all local churches are not independent. They support and maintain stable and close connections with one another.

In 1983, the Church of God in Hong Kong established the Light and Love Home as a non-profit organization to further serve the community, especially the needed ones, and to preach the Gospel. Light and Love Home has already developed their services to other countries apart from Hong Kong and to serve the local people. Light and Love Home promotes its international services to different countries including Madagascar, to especially care for the orphans, set up orphanages and schools and to provide educational sponsorships and scholarships.

Organization 

The Church of God in Hong Kong obeys the teachings of the bible that the church is being ministered by a group of elders who are more mature among the brothers and sisters. Some elders steadfastly pray and preach as full-time co-workers, some are on-the-job while all of them devote themselves and shepherd the young ones. The Church of God in Hong Kong also sets to serve the household.

Meeting places in Hong Kong

Hong Kong Island 
 The Church of God in Hong Kong (Shau Kei Wan)
 The Church of God in Hong Kong (Sheung Wan)

Kowloon 
 The Church of God in Hong Kong (Kwun Tong Montery Plaza)
 The Church of God in Hong Kong (Ngau Tau Kok Ting On Street)

New Territories 
 The Church of God in Hong Kong Main Office ( Lai Chi Kok Bay Garden)
 The Church of God in Hong Kong (Yuet Bor Building, Kwai Fong )
 The Church of God in Hong Kong ( Victory Court, Kwai Fong)
 The Church of God in Hong Kong (Yuet Loong Building, Kwai Fong)
 The Church of God in Hong Kong (Chik Shun Street, Tai Wai)
 The Church of God in Hong Kong (Lai Sing Mansion, Tai Wai)
 The Church of God in Hong Kong (Kwong Fuk Road, Tai Po)
 The Church of God in Hong Kong (Fu Hing Street, Sheung Shui)
 The Church of God in Hong Kong (Tuen Mun Central Square)
 The Church of God in Hong Kong (Wing Fu Mansion, Yuen Long)
 The Church of God in Hong Kong (Ping Shan, Yuen Long)
 The Church of God in Hong Kong (Ping Wu Garden, Tin Shui Wai)

Meeting places all over the world 
The Church of God in Hong Kong not only preaches in Hong Kong but also follows the Lord’s big commandments to bring Gods blessings to the world. In 1982, the Church of God in Hong Kong first established the Church of God in Macau. Now, the church acquired 59 meeting places globally, all practicing “Global Unity”. The Church of God in Hong Kong continuously holds international united meetings and activities, as well as gathering brothers and sisters to form missionary teams to preach in different parts of the world and support local churches.

Church management and fiscal management 
All the expenses of the Church of God in Hong Kong are the offerings/ dedication from the believers. The church regularly updates the financial report and holds annual assemblies to make their financial situation open to public.

The Church of God in Hong Kong sets up a financial committee to inspect the revenue and expenditure of the church, which is finally examined by the elders. The church entrusts auditors to carry out financial audit and publicizes the audit report every year.

Affiliate organisations 

Affiliate organisations of the Church of God in Hong Kong includes:

Light and Love Home 
Light and Love Home Hong Kong was founded in 1983, with motto as “to serve the community and preach the Gospel”. The organization established its first non-profit making private elderly home to serve the local seniors in need. Today, Light and Love Elderly Hostel has already developed into a large-scale elderly home which is funded by the Community Chest of Hong Kong. Light and Love Home has also diversified its services in recent years.

Life’s Spring Publisher Ltd. 
Life’s Spring Publisher Ltd. was established in 1987.  It has been governed by a group of zealous Christians of the Church of God In Hong Kong, with a purpose to help build a church according to the principles of the Holy Bible. Through its print and multimedia publications, Life’s Spring Publisher Ltd. hopes to preach the gospel, spread out the biblical truths, build up saints, and establish a church that is after God’s heart.

Sing Through the Land Music Centre 
Sing Through the Land Music Centre was founded by a group of Christians from the Church of God in Hong Kong since 2015. It hopes to spread the will of God and share His love throughout the world by hymns and music. It has been nurturing music talents and providing various performance opportunities since its establishment. The centre is committed to provide music education to all walks of life irrespective of their diversified musical background and abilities.

Vital Comfort 
Vital Comfort was established in 1989 to promote a rich life, a healthy life is based, has been collecting from all over the wide range of health foods and products, and at a reasonable price. Registration provides lush natural health foods, including organic grains and cereals, fresh organic fruits and vegetables, bread made with organic flour, organic beverages, and various supplements. In addition, provide other health products, such as organic personal care products, shampoo and hair care products, cleansing and moisturizing products, high-quality family-mixers and juice machines, more regular health talks and activities to further enhance the public health awareness.

Recent events

Miracle of Music 
On the 1st January 2017, the Church of God in Hong Kong, together with Sing Through the Land Music Centre and Light and Love Home, organized an event called “Miracle of Music”, which successfully broke the Guinness World Records Largest Ukulele Ensemble with 6,125 participants. Through this event, the organizers hope to promote and raise public awareness on the importance of healthy family, harmonious community and happy person through learning, performing  and breaking record together.

Goal to Fly Music Volunteering Program 
The Church of God in Hong Kong organized Goal to Fly Music Volunteering Program in Summer 2016. Through the influence of music, Goal to Fly hopes to bless the world and let people know God's love and His will. During the summer of 2016, "Goal to Fly" held a series of concerts.  Through performance like music, drama and dance, the concerts presented the challenges and aspirations of young people to explore the true meaning of life and value.

Love & Joy Hong Kong 
The Church of God in Hong Kong organized regional gospel activities in Hong Kong, including carnivals at Fly the Flyover Operation and an Ocean Park fun day with over 6,000 participants.

Defamation controversies 
In 1981, a cult organization “

Children of God” was active in Hong Kong, and attracted a lot of local news coverage. However, news reporters linked The Church of God in Hong Kong with cult activities and made false reports.

In July 1985, the Church of God in Hong Kong filed with the High Court for defamatory reports of Luen Yik Publishing.

In 1986, another publisher made a false report towards the Church of God in Hong Kong. The editor of the publisher (Overseas Chinese Daily News) made an apology and clarified after knowing the truth.

Victory in the case of defamation 
The case of the Church of God in Hong Kong underwent one week of trial in May 1987. Conclusion of the case, Hong Kong judge ruled in favor of the Church of God, receiving a compensation of 260 thousands. In the judgement, the judge praised the elders representing the church in the court.

References 

Churches in Hong Kong